The Owls' Nest is a drawing by Hieronymus Bosch, now in the Museum Boijmans Van Beuningen.

Bibliography
Bruyn, Eric de (2001) De vergeten beeldentaal van Jheronimus Bosch, 's-Hertogenbosch: Heinen, .

Drawings in the Museum Boijmans Van Beuningen
Drawings by Hieronymus Bosch
Birds in art